Ernest Maurice Tassart (18 November 1868 in Paris – 26 August 1930 in Marylebone) was a French competitor in foil fencing competitions at the 1900 Summer Olympics. He owned Tassart's Salle D'Armes at Margaret Street, Oxford Circus, London during the 1910s and regularly held the annual varsity (Oxford vs. Cambridge university) fencing matches.

References

External links

1868 births
1930 deaths
French male foil fencers
Olympic fencers of France
Fencers at the 1900 Summer Olympics
Fencers from Paris
French emigrants to England